Forest Alton "Junior" Daugherty, Jr (born July 19, 1930, in Alamogordo, Otero County, New Mexico, died March 8th, 2023) was a fiddler, guitar player and songwriter. He has been ranked among the top five fiddlers in the United States over a fifteen-year period. Daugherty won the New Mexico state fiddling championship eight years, the Southwest Regional Championship, and has been inducted into the New Mexico Fiddler's Hall of Fame and the Arizona Fiddler's Hall of Fame. Daugherty has performed around the world at cowboy poetry events and at Carnegie Hall.

Daugherty married in 1950 and has three daughters, all musicians. He now lives in Colorado. He has participated in several recent music events, including the 2018 Festival of American Fiddle Tunes and 2021 Western & Swing Weekend Online.

Recordings 
Honkytonkin
A Labor of Love - Junior Daugherty and his Circle of Friends
Lights of Pinon
Back Stage with Junior Daugherty
Fun Fiddlin
Just Waltzin
Just Fiddling’ - Vol 2
Just Fiddling’ - Vol I

References

External links
ReverbNation
Discogs
CDBaby
iTunes

External links

Too Pretty for Words
Dixie Doughboys with Junior Daugherty and Sean Blackburn
YouTube -- Junior Daugherty

1930 births
Living people
Old-time fiddlers
Musicians from New Mexico
People from Alamogordo, New Mexico
American fiddlers
United States Navy sailors
People from Douglas County, Colorado
21st-century violinists